Scaevola gaudichaudii, the ridgetop naupaka, is a shrub in the family Goodeniaceae.  The flowers are yellow. 
The plant is endemic to Hawaii.

It was first described by William J. Hooker and George Arnott Walker-Arnott in 1832 in the Botany of Captain Beechey's Voyage... and was given the specific epithet, gaudichaudii, to honour Charles Gaudichaud-Beaupré.

Description
This Scaevola likes full sun and harsh, dry, and windy locations. It flowers all year round with flowers which are weakly fragrant, and vary in colour from dark yellow, brownish-yellow to pinkish. The drupes are small and purple.

References

External links

gaudichaudii
Endemic flora of Hawaii
Taxa named by William Jackson Hooker
Plants described in 1832
Flora without expected TNC conservation status